Combretol is an O-methylated flavonol, a type of flavonoid. It is the 3,7,3',4',5'-O-methylation of myricetin and can be extracted from Combretum quadrangulare and from Rhodomyrtus tomentosa.

References 

O-methylated flavonols
Methoxy compounds